A Kartvelophile is a person who is fond of, admires or loves Georgian culture, Georgian history, Georgian language, Georgian cuisine, Georgian people or Georgia in general or even exhibits Georgian nationalism in spite of not being an ethnic Georgian. Such love of Georgia and everything Georgian is called "Kartvelophilia". Its opposite is Kartvelophobia.

Typical interests
Georgian wine
Georgian cuisine
Georgian language
Georgian literature
Georgian scripts
Georgian calligraphy

Notable Kartvelophiles
Lyn Coffin
Francis Ford Coppola
Victoria Lopyreva
Michael McFaul
Simon Sebag Montefiore
Eldar Ryazanov
Anastasia Zavorotnyuk

See also
Russophilia
Persophilia

References

Culture of Georgia (country)
Admiration of foreign cultures
Orientalism by type